TDP-4-oxo-6-deoxy-alpha-D-glucose-3,4-oxoisomerase (dTDP-3-dehydro-6-deoxy-alpha-D-galactopyranose-forming) (dTDP-6-deoxy-hex-4-ulose isomerase, TDP-6-deoxy-hex-4-ulose isomerase, FdtA) is an enzyme with systematic name dTDP-4-dehydro-6-deoxy-alpha-D-glucopyranose:dTDP-3-dehydro-6-deoxy-alpha-D-galactopyranose isomerase. This enzyme catalyses the following chemical reaction

 dTDP-4-dehydro-6-deoxy-alpha-D-glucopyranose  dTDP-3-dehydro-6-deoxy-alpha-D-galactopyranose

The enzyme is involved in the biosynthesis of dTDP-3-acetamido-3,6-dideoxy-alpha-D-galactose.

References

External links 
 

EC 5.3.2